Fugue is a 2018 Polish drama film directed by Agnieszka Smoczyńska. It was screened in the International Critics' Week section at the 2018 Cannes Film Festival.

Cast
Gabriela Muskala as Alicja & Kinga
Lukasz Simlat as Krzysztof
Malgorzata Buczkowska as Ewa
Piotr Skiba as Michal
Halina Rasiakówna as Mother
Zbigniew Walerys as Father

Reception
In a mainly positive review for the Krakow Post Giuseppe Sedia wrote: "Smoczynska's self-sustaining talent is capable of shining with its own light even without the sequins from her daring debut effort", adding however that it "could crush the hopes of the viewers pursuing extravagance or originality at any cost".

References

External links

2018 films
2018 drama films
Polish drama films
2010s Polish-language films